Sphaerolobium vimineum, commonly known as leafless globe-pea, is a species of flowering plant in the family Fabaceae and is endemic to Australia. It is an erect, rush-like, mostly leafless shrub with yellow and reddish flowers arranged in small groups along the stems.

Description
Flowering occurs from September to December and the fruit is a spherical pod  in diameter.

Sphaerolobium minus is a similar species but has uniformly grey sepals, the wings about the same length as the keel and the wings much longer than broad.

Taxonomy and naming
Sphaerolobium vimineum was first formally described in 1805 by James Edward Smith in the Annals of Botany. The specific epithet (vimineum) means "having long, flexible twigs or shoots".

Distribution and habitat
Leafless globe-pea usually grows in heath and forest from south-east Queensland, along the coast and tablelands of New South Wales, through the higher rainfall parts of southern Victoria, west to the far south-east of South Australia, and south to Tasmania. It is also widespread in the Esperance Plains, Jarrah Forest, Swan Coastal Plain and Warren bioregions of south-western Western Australia.

References

vimineum
Eudicots of Western Australia
Flora of Queensland
Flora of New South Wales
Flora of Victoria (Australia)
Flora of Tasmania
Flora of South Australia
Plants described in 1805
Taxa named by James Edward Smith